Lorca Fútbol Club "B" was a Spanish football team based in La Hoya, a hamlet of Lorca, in the autonomous community of Murcia. Founded in 2012, it was the reserve team of Lorca FC, holding home games at Campo de Fútbol Los Tollos.

History
Founded in 2012 as La Hoya Lorca CF's reserve team, the club achieved an immediate promotion to Primera Regional de Murcia as champions, but only reached the Preferente category in the 2015–16 campaign, which also ended in promotion. After the club's name change to Lorca FC, the B-side also became Lorca FC B, and reached the play-offs in their debut season in Tercera División.

Season to season

2 seasons in Tercera División

Squad

References

External links
Official website 
La Preferente profile 

Football clubs in the Region of Murcia
Association football clubs established in 2012
Association football clubs disestablished in 2020
2012 establishments in Spain
2020 disestablishments in Spain
Lorca, Spain